Patricio Escudero (born 16 March 1935) is a Chilean equestrian. He competed in two events at the 1968 Summer Olympics.

References

External links
 

1935 births
Living people
Chilean male equestrians
Olympic equestrians of Chile
Chilean dressage riders
Equestrians at the 1968 Summer Olympics
Pan American Games medalists in equestrian
Pan American Games gold medalists for Chile
Pan American Games silver medalists for Chile
Equestrians at the 1967 Pan American Games
Sportspeople from Santiago
Medalists at the 1967 Pan American Games
20th-century Chilean people
21st-century Chilean people